The sharpnose wrasse or possum wrasse (Wetmorella nigropinnata) is a species of wrasse native to the Indo-Pacific region, from the Red Sea across to Pitcairn Island. They live in coral reefs. They were a minor importance for commercial fisheries and it could be found in the aquarium trade.

References

External links
 Fishes of Australia : Wetmorella nigropinnata

sharpnose wrasse
Marine fish of Northern Australia
sharpnose wrasse
Taxa named by Alvin Seale